Jean Marcel Pierre Auguste Vérot, known commonly as Augustin Vérot (May 1804 – June 10, 1876) was a French-born American prelate of the Catholic Church who served as the first bishop of the Diocese of St. Augustine in Florida (1870–1876).  

Vérot previously served as the third bishop of the Diocese of Savannah in Georgia (1861–1870) and as the vicar apostolic of Florida (1857-1870).

Biography

Early life 
Augustin Vérot was born on May 23, 1805, in Le Puy-en-Velay in France.  He studied at St-Sulpice seminary in Paris.

Vérot was ordained into the priesthood for the Society of Priests of Saint Sulpice by Archbishop Hyacinthe-Louis de Quélen on September 20, 1828.  He subsequently joined the Society of Saint-Sulpice and in 1830 immigrated to the United States, working in Baltimore, Maryland. Vérot taught science, philosophy, and theology at St. Mary's College in Baltimore and at its seminary until 1853. He served as pastor of Saint Paul Catholic Parish in Ellicott's Mills, Maryland from 1853 to 1858.

Vicar Apostolic of Florida 
On December 11, 1857, Pope Pius IX appointed Vérot as vicar apostolic of Florida.  He was consecrated as titular bishop of Danabe on April 25, 1858, by Archbishop Francis  Kenrick in the Cathedral of the Assumption of the Blessed Virgin Mary in Baltimore.

Since the new vicarate had only three priests, Vérot travelled to France in 1859 to recruit more.  He succeeded in bringing back seven priests. While in Europe, Vérot also secured funding to repair churches in St. Augustine, Jacksonville, and Key West, all in Florida. He erected new churches at Tampa, Fernandina Beach, Palatka, Mandarin, and Tallahassee, and staffed them with resident pastors. Vérot also built Catholic schools in the vicariate and introduced religious communities to staff them. Five sisters of the Order of Mercy traveled from the Diocese of Hartford in Connecticut to open a girls' academy in Florida. Three Christian Brothers from Canada opened a boys' school in St. Augustine.

Bishop of Savannah 
On July 13, 1861, Pius IX appointed Vérot as bishop of the Diocese of Savannah.  However, he also remained as vicar apostolic of Florida.  

During the American Civil War, Vérot condemned the looting of the Catholic church at Amelia Island, Florida, by Union Army troops.  He personally evacuated several Sisters of Mercy from Jacksonville to Savannah through the battle zone in Georgia. After the war, Vérot published a pastoral letter urging Catholics in the diocese to "put away all prejudice ...against their former servants".  He also advocated a national coordinator for evangelization among African-Americans, and brought in French sisters from LePuy to work with them.

Bishop of St. Augustine 
On March 11, 1870, Pius IX elevated the Florida vicarate into the Diocese of St. Augustine and named Vérot as its first bishop.

Vérot was among the first public figures to promote St. Augustine, Florida, as a health and cultural resort. He made an annual visitation of the whole diocese, establishing churches and schools. He worked revive the memory of Florida's early martyrs, both Spanish and French. 

Vérot's best-known writings are his Pastoral on Slavery and his Catechism. He took a prominent part in the Plenary Council of Baltimore and the First Vatican Council in Rome between 1869 and 1870. At the Council, Vérot called for the condemnation of the heresy that African-Americans had no souls and were not human beings.

Views on slavery 
In January 1861, just before the start of the Civil War, Vérot delivered a sermon defending the rights of the slavery states and the legal basis of slavery in the United States.  He also condemned what he termed the "false and unjust principles of Abolitionism" and the Know-Nothing movement that persecuted Catholics throughout the nation. His sermon was published and distributed throughout the Southern United States as a Confederate tract.  

In the same sermon, Vérot condemned the international slave trade (consistent with Pope Gregory XVI's decree of 1839).  He also called for legal protections for free African-Americans.  Verot also wanted enslaved people to be allowed to choose their own marriage partners; to be treated with justice, fairness and morality; to receive adequate food, clothing and shelter; and to be given the means to practice their own religion and received instruction on it. 

For this sermon, Verot earned the nickname "Rebel Bishop".

See also

 Catholic Church hierarchy
 Catholic Church in the United States
 Historical list of the Catholic bishops of the United States
 List of Catholic bishops of the United States
 Lists of patriarchs, archbishops, and bishops

References

External links
 New Advent Encyclopedia entry on Bishop Verot
 Roman Catholic Diocese of Savannah
Roman Catholic Diocese of St. Augustine

Episcopal succession

1804 births
1876 deaths
French emigrants to the United States
Seminary of Saint-Sulpice (France) alumni
19th-century Roman Catholic bishops in the United States
St. Mary's Seminary and University faculty
Roman Catholic bishops of Saint Augustine
Roman Catholic bishops of Savannah, Georgia
Sulpician bishops